The 2022 Vietnam Women's National League, known as the Thai Son Bac Cup for sponsorship reasons, was the 25th season of the Vietnam Women's Football League, the professional women's football league in Vietnam. The season commenced on 30 August 2022 and finished on 30 October 2022.

Ho Chi Minh City were the seven-time defending champions.

Changes from previous season
The league expanded to 7 clubs from the 2021 season with Hanoi and Ho Chi Minh City fielding their second teams.

Name changes
Due to the end of the sponsorship deal with Watabe Wedding, Hanoi removed Watabe from their name.

Teams

Stadiums and locations
The league plays in centralized venues as in previous seasons. The matches for the first half of the season will be played at the Vietnam Youth Football Training Center, located in the Nam Tu Liem district of Hanoi. The second half will be played at Ha Nam Stadium in Phu Ly.

Personnel and kits

Standings

League table
<onlyinclude>

Positions by round

Results

Season statistics

Top scorers

Source: Soccerway

Hat-tricks

Awards

Annual awards

References

External links
Official Page

Vietnam
Vietnam
2022 in Vietnamese football
Vietnam